Third National Bank may refer to:

in the United States
(by state)
Third National Bank (Atlanta, Georgia), now The Metropolitan (Atlanta condominium building)
 Third National Bank (Glasgow, Kentucky), listed on the NRHP in Kentucky
 Third National Bank (Ohio), a predecessor of Fifth Third Bank
 Third National Bank (Syracuse, New York), listed on the NRHP in New York
 Third National Bank (Sandusky, Ohio), listed on the NRHP in Ohio
 Third National Bank in Nashville, now incorporated within SunTrust Bank